Plaza Uruguay is a park in Polanco, Mexico City, Mexico. The park features a bronze sculpture depicting José Gervasio Artigas.

References

External links

 

Miguel Hidalgo, Mexico City
Parks in Mexico City
Plazas in Mexico City
Polanco, Mexico City